Pliska Ridge is a three-peaked ridge rising to 667 m in eastern Livingston Island in the South Shetland Islands, Antarctica.  Its central and highest summit, Pliska Peak, is located 2.48 km east-northeast of Willan Nunatak (449 m), 1.81 km southeast of Burdick Peak (773 m, summit of Burdick Ridge), 3.53 km south-southwest of Mount Bowles, 3.68 km west-southwest of Kuzman Knoll, and 3.61 km northwest of Mount Friesland. The feature is 1.6 km long and 500 m wide, its axis trending due east-west, with precipitous southern slopes. It is ice-covered except for segments of its easternmost peak (646 m) and is bounded to the northwest by Orpheus Gate, to the north by the head of Perunika Glacier, to the east by Nesebar Gap, and to the south and west by the head of Huntress Glacier, the latter flowing 6 km southwestwards into False Bay.

First ascent by the Bulgarian Lyubomir Ivanov from Camp Academia on 18 December 2004.

Pliska is the name of a settlement in north-eastern Bulgaria, which in the seventh century became the capital of the First Bulgarian Empire.

Location

Maps
 Isla Livingston: Península Hurd. Mapa topográfico de escala 1:25000. Madrid: Servicio Geográfico del Ejército, 1991. (Map reproduced on p. 16 of the linked work)
 L.L. Ivanov. Livingston Island: Central-Eastern Region. Scale 1:25000 topographic map.  Sofia: Antarctic Place-names Commission of Bulgaria, 1996.
 L.L. Ivanov et al. Antarctica: Livingston Island and Greenwich Island, South Shetland Islands. Scale 1:100000 topographic map. Sofia: Antarctic Place-names Commission of Bulgaria, 2005.
 L.L. Ivanov. Antarctica: Livingston Island and Greenwich, Robert, Snow and Smith Islands. Scale 1:120000 topographic map.  Troyan: Manfred Wörner Foundation, 2009.  
 Antarctic Digital Database (ADD). Scale 1:250000 topographic map of Antarctica. Scientific Committee on Antarctic Research (SCAR). Since 1993, regularly upgraded and updated.
 L.L. Ivanov. Antarctica: Livingston Island and Smith Island. Scale 1:100000 topographic map. Manfred Wörner Foundation, 2017.

References
 Pliska Ridge. SCAR Composite Antarctic Gazetteer
 Bulgarian Antarctic Gazetteer. Antarctic Place-names Commission. (details in Bulgarian, basic data in English)

External links
 Pliska Ridge. Copernix satellite image

Ridges of Livingston Island
Pliska